Technical Institute of Kuala Lumpur (TiKL) , is a technical and cluster school located in Bandar Tun Razak, Cheras, Kuala Lumpur and it's the oldest technical school in Malaysia that was founded in 1926.

History

The establishment of TiKL can be traced back in 1926. In 1927, The Federated Malay State Government Trade School was created after the Federated Malay States government wished to train skilled workers in technical fields by Mr Noel Leembruggen, an ILO officer and engineer and Mr. Geary, a superintendent.  The first site for the school was located at Jalan Kolam Air with only seven staff. In 1946, the school changed its name to Junior Technical Trade School with enrolment of 80 students.

Its name was changed again to Technical Institute after the Report of the Education Committee in 1956 (known as 'Penyata Razak') which also suggested that the school transform into a full secondary school which offered its students basic technical skill for the Lower Certificate of Education (LCE) holders. The first batch of students for the Technical Institute was enrolled in February 1957 with Mr. Lai Nyen Foo as the principal. The teachers then were Mr Rozario, Mr Takashi Mori Jr., Mr.Vivien Voo, Mr. Lee Hoch Siew. Mr Leembruggen (1957/58), Mr Wong, Mr Cheong, Mr. Danial, Mr. Zaki, Mr How Chin Cheong and a few more. The first batch graduated in December 1959.
Finally in 1962, the school changed its name to Sekolah Menengah Teknik Kuala Lumpur.

In 1967 TiKL moved out from Jalan Kolam Air to Jalan Tenteram (now known as Jalan Yaacob Latiff), Bandar Tun Razak.  Other  institutions located along this road are Sekolah Menengah Sains Alam Shah (previously Sekolah Alam Shah which was then moved to Putrajaya and changed its name to Sekolah Sultan Alam Shah) and Sekolah Menengah Sains Selangor.

Achievements 

2008
 TiKL was chosen as one of the Ministry of Education (MOE) second batch's Cluster Schools. Three niche areas of the school are Netball, Fire and Rescue Cadet and also the subject Engineering Drawing.
 TiKL student, Wan Muhammad Idham was chosen as Malaysian Best Co-Curricular Student 2008 in Pulau Pinang.
 TiKL Pantun Team emerged as champion in Kuala Lumpur Pantun Festival, shocking SMT Setapak who was a favorite in the competition held at SMK Wangsa Melawati KL. TiKL went to represent KL in the national level at Perlis.
 TiKL Multimedia Team, whose members include that of the winning innovation team 2007, emerged as the second runner-up in UM-Climate Change Video Competition 2008.

2007
 In co-curriculum activities, TiKL Fire and Rescue Cadet held the number 1 ranking in Kuala Lumpur, and went to represent Kuala Lumpur in the National Level of Fire and Rescue Cadet Camping 2007 held at Malacca.
 In December 2007, TiKL win National Innovation Award 2007 for School Category at Dewan Merdeka, PWTC with innovation project known as Efficient Riding System.

2006
 TiKL was runner-up of Best Technical School in Malaysia.
 TiKL was chosen as Sekolah Harapan Negara by the Ministry Education of Malaysia.
 TiKL English Debaters Team won in the Regional and National stage of Piala Dato' Azmi Debating Competition. Third time in a row.

2005
 The TiKL Tae Kwon Do team, trained by Master Bala, won five gold medals in MSSKL and was second in the boys U-17. This was the best ever achievement of the team.
 Four students were selected to represent Malaysia in an Eco Youth Camp in Thailand.
 TiKL English Debaters Team won in the Regional (in Gombak) and National (in Sungai Buloh) stage of Piala Dato' Azmi Debating Competition. Second time in a row.

2004
 TiKL Scout Team, KRS and Fire and Rescue Cadet won Champion in Zon Pudu District stage Marching Competition.
 TiKL Scout Team won 1st runner-up in Wilayah Persekutuan Kuala Lumpur State stage Marching Competition.
 TiKL Fire and Rescue Cadet and KRS won 2nd runner-up in Wilayah Persekutuan Kuala Lumpur State stage Marching Competition.
 TiKL English Debaters Team won in the Regional (in Kajang) and National (in Pulau Pinang) stage of Piala Dato' Azmi Debating Competition.

Notable alumni

Arumugam Vijiaratnam - Singaporean engineer and Olympic athlete (football and rugby) 
Mohamed Azmin Ali

References 

Technical schools in Malaysia
Secondary schools in Malaysia
Publicly funded schools in Malaysia
Educational institutions established in 1926
1926 establishments in British Malaya